Veronika Borisovna Kropotina (born 2 January 1991) is a Russian former competitive figure skater. Coached by Elena Buianova, she won three medals — two silvers and one gold — on the ISU Junior Grand Prix, and placed 12th at the 2005 World Junior Championships. She qualified for the 2005–06 JGP Final but withdrew before the event.

Programs

Competitive highlights

References

External links

 

Russian female single skaters
1991 births
Figure skaters from Moscow
Living people
21st-century Russian women